Strictly speaking, a mummer is an actor in a traditional seasonal folk play. The term is also humorously (or derogatorily) applied to any actor.

Mummer may also refer to:
 A participant in the New Year's Day Mummers Parade in Philadelphia, USA, and other similar festivals
 A participant in the Newfoundland and Labrador Christmas time tradition of mummering
 A participant in Mummer's Day, a midwinter celebration in Padstow, Cornwall, UK
 A mime artist, one acting out a story through body motions, without use of speech
 A member of the Summer Mummers theatre group in Midland, Texas, USA
 MUMmer, a bioinformatics software system
 Mummer (album), a 1983 album by the group XTC
 The Mummers, a band based in Brighton, England